Marwa or Marwah is an Arabic female given name derived from the word  with the meaning of either minerals, 'flint(-stone)', 'quartz' or 'a hard stone of nearly pure silica'.

The name is written Marva in the Persian form. During the Ottoman Period, the name was written Mervat or Marwa, or Merve in the modern Turkish form.

For the Kuria people, Marwa is used as a masculine name, reserved for the firstborn male in a family, along with names Chacha or Mwita.  Firstborn girls are called either Bhoke, Robi, or Gati.

The male variant of this given name is Marwan. Marwa is also a surname.

Given name
Marwa Abidi (born 1990), Tunisian footballer 
Marwa Amri (born 1989), Tunisian freestyle wrestler
Marwa Arsanios (born 1978), Lebanese artist, researcher and filmmaker 
Marwa Daoudy, Swiss associate professor of international relations
Marwa Elselehdar, Egyptian female ship captain
Marwa Hassan, Egyptian entrepreneur and fashion influencer on social media
Marwa Hassani (born 2002), French-born Moroccan footballer
Marwa Hussein, Egyptian hammer throw athlete
Marwa Khamis (born 1985), Lebanese footballer 
Marwa Khmiri, Tunisian footballer
Marwa Loud (born 1996), French singer of Moroccan origin
Marwa Al-Sabouni (born 1981), Syrian architect and writer
Marwa El-Sherbini, Egyptian woman murdered in a courtroom in Dresden, Germany
Marwa Rakha, Egyptian relationship and dating expert
Marwa Range (born 1977), Kenyan football referee
Marwa Sultan (born 1983), Egyptian sport shooter
Marwa Tbini, Tunisian footballer 
Marwa Zein, Afro-Arab film director, scriptwriter and film producer

Middle name
Dickson Marwa Mkami (born 1982), Tanzanian long-distance runner

Surname
Agnes Marwa (born 1978), Tanzanian politician 
Amarjeet Singh Marwa (born 1947), Kenyan field hockey player
Asmita Marwa, Indian fashion designer
Emil Marwa (born 1974), British actor
Harvinder Singh Marwa (born 1943), Kenyan field hockey player
Hisham Marwa, Syrian lawyer, director of the legal office of the Syrian National Council
Joseph Marwa (boxer) (born 1964), Tanzanian boxer
Mohammed Buba Marwa, Nigerian Brigadier General
Samson Mwita Marwa (1932–2022), Kenyan member of parliament

See also
 for articles on persons with this first name
Maitatsine, born Mohammed Marwa, controversial Islamic scholar
Marwa (disambiguation)

Notes

Arabic feminine given names